Itsaso Arana Baztan (born 20 August 1985) is a Spanish actress and writer.

Biography 
She founded the theatre company 'La tristura' alongside another two RESAD alumni. She has since featured in films such as Acantilado or Diecisiete and series such as 14 de abril. La República, Vergüenza, High Seas, Dime Quién Soy: Mistress of War and Reyes de la noche.

In 2022, she wrapped shooting of her debut feature as a director, Las chicas están bien, in which she also plays an acting part.

Filmography 

Film

Television

Accolades

References 

21st-century Spanish actresses
Spanish film actresses
Spanish television actresses
1985 births
Living people